Sedella leiocarpa is a rare species of flowering plant in the family Crassulaceae known by the common names Lake County mock stonecrop and Lake County stonecrop. It is endemic to Lake County, California, where it is known from only about ten occurrences in two locations. It is a resident of drying vernal pools and rocky clay flats, where it grows in colonies. It is a federally listed endangered species. This is an annual herb growing no more than four centimeters high. It is a tiny erect reddish or yellow succulent plant with sparse leaves each a few millimeters long. The flowers have yellow to reddish petals 3 or 4 millimeters long.

References

External links
Jepson Manual Treatment
USDA Plants Profile
California Native Plant Society Rare Plant Profile
Flora of North America
Photo gallery

Crassulaceae
Endemic flora of California
Natural history of Lake County, California